William Cooper was Governor of the Bank of England from 1769 to 1771. He had been Deputy Governor from 1768 to 1769. He replaced Matthew Clarmont as Governor and was succeeded by Edward Payne. Cooper's tenure as Governor occurred during the Bengal bubble crash (1769–1784).

See also
Chief Cashier of the Bank of England

References

External links

Governors of the Bank of England
Year of birth missing
Year of death missing
British bankers
Deputy Governors of the Bank of England